Alexander Scotcher (born 29 January 1980) is a British former freestyle swimmer.

An Aldershot-born swimmer, Scotcher attended Loughborough University and was a two-time  gold medalist representing Great Britain at the World University Games.

Scotcher swam at the 2003 World Championships in Barcelona.

In 2006, Scotcher won a gold medal with England's  team at the Melbourne Commonwealth Games, swimming the second leg of the final. The favourites Australia finished in the bronze medal position and it was the first time since 1950 that they had failed to secure gold in the event.

References

1980 births
Living people
British male freestyle swimmers
English male freestyle swimmers
Alumni of Loughborough University
Sportspeople from Aldershot
Universiade gold medalists for Great Britain
Universiade silver medalists for Great Britain
Universiade medalists in swimming
Medalists at the 2001 Summer Universiade
Medalists at the 2003 Summer Universiade
Medalists at the 2005 Summer Universiade
Commonwealth Games gold medallists for England
Commonwealth Games medallists in swimming
Medallists at the 2006 Commonwealth Games
Swimmers at the 2006 Commonwealth Games